This is a list of Norwegian television related events from 2001.

Events
24 February - The television reality show Big Brother Norway debuts on TVN.
31 May - The first series of Big Brother Norway is won by Lars Joakim Ringom.
Unknown - Benedikte Narum, performing as Joni Mitchell wins the fifth series of Stjerner i sikte.

Debuts
24 February - Big Brother Norway (2001-2003, 2011)

Television shows

1990s
Stjerner i sikte (1996-2002)

Ending this year

Births

Deaths

See also
2001 in Norway